Mélamare is a commune in the Seine-Maritime department in the Normandy region in northern France.

Geography

History
Tradition holds that Saint Honorina (Sainte-Honorine) was martyred here in 303AD.  There is a chapel dedicated to her in the town. The town name was recorded as Mellomara in the thirteenth century.  After the revocation of the Edict of Nantes, Protestantism survived here clandestinely.

Population

Places of interest
 The thirteenth century chapel of St. Honorine.
 The church of St.Jacques-et-Sainte-Anne, dating from the twelfth century.
 An old windmill.

See also
Communes of the Seine-Maritime department

References

Communes of Seine-Maritime